Water, Air, & Soil Pollution is a monthly peer-reviewed scientific journal covering the study of environmental pollution. It was established in 1971 and is published by Springer Science+Business Media. The editor-in-chief is Jack T. Trevors. According to the Journal Citation Reports, the journal has a 2017 impact factor of 1.769.

References

External links

Springer Science+Business Media academic journals
Publications established in 1971
Monthly journals
English-language journals
Environmental science journals